As the participants of the 2006 FIBA World Championship, Lithuanians automatically qualified into the EuroBasket 2007, held in Spain without competing in the FIBA EuroBasket 2007 qualification. New national team coach Ramūnas Butautas debuted (the son of the famous Soviet Union national team player Stepas Butautas). The Lithuanian basketball team of 2007 finished the EuroBasket 2007 with an 8–1 record, winning their first ever bronze medal in EuroBasket tournaments. Winning the third place game in the tournament against Greece allowed Lithuania to qualify for the Olympic basketball tournament at Beijing 2008. Šarūnas Jasikevičius led the tournament in assists by averaging 5.6 assists per game. Lithuania also was one of the best scoring teams in the tournament, averaging 82.0 points per game and were outclassed only by the Spain national team which averaged 82.1 points per game.

EuroBasket 2007 roster 
The complete roster of the EuroBasket 2007 bronze medals winning Lithuania national team.

 coach Ramūnas Butautas
 assistant Rimas Kurtinaitis
 assistant Robertas Kuncaitis
 assistant Donaldas Kairys
 assistant Virginijus Mikalauskas
 press officer Linas Kunigėlis
 doctor Vytenis Trumpickas
 doctor Rimtautas Gudas

EuroBasket 2007 games

Preliminary round
Lithuania been a part of the Group C, along with Germany, Turkey and Czech Republic national teams. They took the first place in the group after reaching all three victories.

Second round
At the second round Lithuania national team been a part of the Group F. They took first place in the group there as well, defeating all the opponents again.

Knockout stage

Quarterfinals

Semi-finals

Third place

Lithuania
2007
Eurobasket